Dr. Asuman Baytop (27 March 1920 - 18 February 2015) was a Turkish botanist, plant collector, pharmacologist, and educator known for her research regarding the medicinal properties of the flora of Turkey.  In 1964, she founded the Department of Pharmaceutical Botany at Istanbul University, and established the department's herbarium, to which she contributed over 23,000 specimens.  She is also noted for describing several species of crocus, and the species Allium baytopiorum and Colchicum baytopiorum are named in her honor.  She was married to fellow botanist Turhan Baytop.

References 

 1920 births
 2015 deaths
Turkish botanists
Women botanists
Academic staff of Istanbul University